Benji Roland (born April 4, 1967) is a former American football defensive end. He played for the Tampa Bay Buccaneers in 1990.

References

1967 births
Living people
American football defensive ends
Auburn Tigers football players
Tampa Bay Buccaneers players